HMS Clio was a wooden 22-gun , built at Sheerness Dockyard and launched on 28 August 1858. She was the flagship of the Australia Station between 3 September 1870 and 16 October 1873, and from 1876 was used as a school ship.

Her first commission was on the Pacific Station and in 1860 she protected Panama City and the French citizens living within the city. While in the Pacific she was dismasted in bad weather. She returned to England and placed in reserve. Under the command of Commodore Frederick Stirling, she became the flagship of the Australia Station on 3 September 1870. In 1871, she was holed after striking an uncharted rock in Bligh Sound and was beached to prevent sinking. HMS Virago provided assistance and made temporary repairs enabling the ships the sail to Wellington, where she was repaired, prior to sailing to Sydney to be dry docked.

She transferred the pennant of flagship to HMS Pearl and sailed for Portsmouth on 16 October 1873. In 1877 she became a school ship, stationed on the Menai Strait at Bangor, and had 260 pupils. She was sold for scrap and broken up in 1919.

In 1865, she sailed to Honolulu and escorted Queen Dowager Emma of the Hawaiian Kingdom to Panama for her trip to the United Kingdom.

Citations

References
Bastock, John (1988), Ships on the Australia Station, Child & Associates Publishing Pty Ltd; Frenchs Forest, Australia.

External links
 
 Photograph of HMS Clio in the Menai Strait 1903
 HMS Clio at the William Loney website
 Training Ships and Nautical Schools, 1700–2000

 

1858 ships
Pearl-class corvettes
Ships built in Sheerness
Training ships of the Royal Navy
Maritime incidents in 1871